Jorge Guerricaechevarría (born 10 July, 1965), also known as 'Guerrica', is a Spanish screenwriter. A regular co-scribe of Álex de la Iglesia's films, he has also been a recurring collaborator of Daniel Monzón.

He won a Goya Award for the script of Cell 211, adapted from the novel of the same name by Francisco Pérez Gandul. He was also nominated for The Day of the Beast, La comunidad, and The Oxford Murders. In 2008, at the Basque film festival Zinemastea, he received an honorary award recognizing his career as a screenwriter.

Filmography

Film

Short film

Other work

Television

Awards and nominees

Premios Goya

References

External links 

 

1964 births
Living people
People from Avilés
Spanish male screenwriters
Writers from Asturias
University of the Basque Country alumni
20th-century Spanish screenwriters
20th-century Spanish male writers
21st-century Spanish screenwriters